or  or just , is the traditional Japanese martial art of restraining a person using cord or rope (called  in Japanese), as a precursor to modern-day handcuffs. Encompassing many different materials, techniques and methods from many different schools, Hojōjutsu is a quintessentially Japanese art that is a unique product of Japanese history and culture.

As a martial arts practice, Hojōjutsu is seldom if ever taught on its own but as part of a curriculum under the aegis of the body of study encompassed by a larger school of bugei or budō, often as an advanced study in jujutsu. Regardless of the source, Hojōjutsu techniques and methods are seldom demonstrated outside Japan.

Techniques and methods
Generally speaking, Hojōjutsu can be divided into two broad categories. In law-enforcement, this cord was carried by constables who secreted the rope in a small bundle that fed cord from one end. This torinawa ("capture-rope") was coiled so that the cord would pay out from one end as the bundled cord was passed around the prisoner's body, neck and arms as he or she was tied. This was usually accomplished by one constable in the course of performing an arrest while the prisoner was actively resisting and had to be accomplished quickly.

Even at this stage, attention was still paid to visual and aesthetic concerns in the tying method as well as to the cultural needs of Japanese society. According to experts, an accused but not convicted prisoner would be tied using methods which allowed the prisoner to be securely restrained but which contained no knots to save the prisoner the shame of being publicly bound. Instead of securing the tie with knots, the constable held on to the free end of the rope and walked behind the prisoner to keep him or her under control as the prisoner was taken for an interrogation which could involve the application of one or more forms of judicial torture to elicit a confession.

The second category utilized with one or occasionally two “main ropes” or “honnawa” which, like the hayanawa, could be any one of many different lengths, but was usually hemp in material. The thickness of this rope averaged at six or more millimeters in diameter, while the length could be as much as 25 meters long. This was used to provide a more secure, long-term binding than is possible with the hayanawa for transportation to a place of incarceration, restraint at legal proceedings, and—in the case of particularly severe crimes—for the public display of the prisoner prior to execution by such methods as beheading, crucifixion (i.e., the prisoner was displayed tied to a cross before spears were driven through the body), or, in arson convictions, death by fire.

Honnawa ties were applied by a group of people, usually not less than four, whose presence allowed the use of more intricate and ornate patterns than was the case with the hayanawa. Both forms combined effective restraint with a distinct visual aesthetic.

In either form, the Hojōjutsu ties known today display a shrewd understanding of human anatomy through several recurrent themes. This can include leverage-removal (tying limbs in positions that decrease the force they can generate), rope-placement to discourage struggling or to make it less effective by placing one or more loops of rope around the neck and constricting restraint around points on the upper arms where determined struggle put pressure on blood vessels and nerves numbing the extremities.

Persistence in modern times
Hojōjutsu shows limited survival in the modern world, both in Japan and elsewhere. Torinawa techniques are taught as part of the curriculum learned by modern Japanese police officers and it remains an advanced topic within schools of jujutsu, following it and other Japanese traditional martial arts as they make their way around the world from Brazil to Eastern Europe. Yoshida ha Shidare Yanagi ryu, art of the late Don Angier, contains an extensive hojōjutsu curriculum.

Although the Honnawa techniques have long been supplanted by handcuffs and leg-irons, some teachers of traditional martial arts in Japan work to continue to maintain the art form. The Soke (head of, and heir to the style) of Masaki-ryu Bujutsu, Nawa Yumio, has written several books on the subject and has worked as an historical consultant on matters dealing with law-enforcement and Mizukoshi Hiro's recently reprinted book Torinawajutsu offers historical background followed by thorough, practical instruction in more than 25 traditional ties including some recreated from rare and very old texts. The Koryu cited are Seigo Ryu Jujutsu, Seishin Ryu Jujutsu, Koden Enshin Ryu Iaijutsu, Nanbu Handen Hojo Jutsu, Kurokawa Ryu Ninjutsu, Kurama Yoshin Ryu Jujutsu, Nagano Ryu Heihou, Mitsuo (Mippa) Muteki Ryu, Bo Ryu and Tenfu Muso Ryu.

That is the late Seiko Fujita’s monumental work, Zukai Torinawajutsu, which could be considered as the encyclopedia of this art, by showing hundreds of ties from many different schools.

See also

Notes

References
 Torinawajutsu (Hojo-jutsu)- Hiro Mizukoshi
 Bugei Ryuha Daijiten

External links

 An article by Richard Cleaver on Hojojutsu, translations from the 1964 works of Headmaster Nawa Yumio
 Images from the Criminal Museum of Meiji University showing torinawa and hojojitsu techniques
 Masaki Ryū
 The ancient art of Hojojutsu
 Kokusai Hojojutsu Kenkyukai / International Hojojutsu Research Society

Physical restraint
Ropework
Japanese martial arts
Ko-ryū bujutsu